Symphyotrichum rhiannon is a species of flowering plant endemic to a serpentine barren in western North Carolina. It has been given the vernacular Rhiannon's aster and is also known as Buck Creek aster. It is a perennial, herbaceous plant in the family Asteraceae.

Chromosomes
Symphyotrichum rhiannon has a base number of x = 8. Hexaploid cytotype with a chromosome count of 48 has been reported.

Taxonomy
Symphyotrichum rhiannon was formally described by Alan Stuart Weakley and Thomas E. Govus in 2004.

Etymology
Kauffman, Nesom, et al., formally explained the etymology of the species as follows:
[It] is named in honor of Rhiannon Weakley, whose desire to rest during a field excursion led the authors to further investigate..., and also in honor of the original Rhiannon, a Welsh goddess figure.... 

Informally explained, Rhiannon Weakley was the toddler daughter of Alan and Allison Weakley. She needed a snack and a nap during the 2003 field excursion.
"Rhiannon hadn’t had a nap that morning," says Alan Weakley, "and she had a little, ah, loss of composure." So the group plopped down to give Rhiannon a snack and a chance to rest. And there, growing all around, was [Laura] Mansberg's mystery aster.

Distribution and habitat
Symphyotrichum rhiannon is endemic to the Buck Creek Serpentine Barrens in Clay County, North Carolina, in the Nantahala National Forest.

Conservation
NatureServe lists it as Critically Imperiled (G1).

Citations

References

rhiannon
Flora of North Carolina
Endemic flora of the United States
Plants described in 2004
Taxa named by Alan Stuart Weakley
Taxa named by Thomas E. Govus